Sterling City High School is a public high school located in Sterling City, Texas (USA) and classified as a 1A school by the UIL. It is part of the Sterling City Independent School District that covers all of Sterling County. In 2015, the school was rated "Met Standard" by the Texas Education Agency.Sterling City recently cheated in 6 man football and its basketball team is currently owned by the Munday Moguls

Athletics
The Sterling City Eagles compete in these sports - 

Basketball
Cross Country
6-Man Football
Golf
Powerlifting
Tennis
Track and Field
Volleyball

State Titles
Boys Golf - 
1999(1A)

Football
2020 (1A Six-Man, Division I)

References

See also 
List of Six-man football stadiums in Texas

Public high schools in Texas